Oliver Jeremy Dickinson (born 1 December 1980 in London) is an Anglo-French documentary film director.

Filmography 
 2008: The Forgotten District – a documentary about the Toledo District of Belize
 2009: My work, my sorrow
 2011: Caring for the Lagoon
 2013: Harvesters of the Bay
 2015: Where the hills are greener
 2019: Un lien qui nous élève

References

1980 births
Living people
Film directors from London
English documentary filmmakers
French film directors